Saksumdal Church is a parish church of the Church of Norway in Lillehammer Municipality in Innlandet county, Norway. It is located in the village of Saksumdalen. It is the church for the Saksumdal parish which is part of the Sør-Gudbrandsdal prosti (deanery) in the Diocese of Hamar. The white, wooden church was built in a long church design in 1875 using plans drawn up by an unknown architect. The church seats about 130 people.

History
Historical records and local traditions show that there was a medieval church in the Saksumdalen valley. The medieval church was closed around the year 1590. Not much is known of the medieval church. After the church closed, the area became a part of the Fåberg Church parish.

In 1874, work on the present church began on a site that was donated by Anders Hovland for the construction of an annex chapel for the Saksumdalen valley. A stone mason named Pedersen and the carpenter Kristian Svendsrud started work on the building after other local people donated local timber and volunteered their time and efforts to build the chapel. The chapel was completed in 1875 and it was consecrated on 26 August 1875 by the Bishop Halvor Olsen Folkestad.

The building has undergone several renovations since its construction. It was wired for electric power in 1928. In 1934, sacristies were built on either side of the choir. It was remodeled again in 1951 which included the addition of leaded glass windows. The pulpit had painted figures of the evangelists added in 1953 and the backs of the church benches were sealed in 1954. Later renovations of the building added a basement, outbuilding, and flood lighting. A wheelchair ramp was added in the 1980s.

Interior
The altarpiece was made by Kristian Svendsrud and given to the church as a gift by landowner Anders Hovland. The first organ was installed in 1895 and has now been replaced with a new one. In the 1980s the altar was adorned with textiles by textile artist Inger Holbø, who also made trade fairs. In 2000 the church received pictures by visual artist Borgny Farstad Svalastog.

See also
List of churches in Hamar

References

Buildings and structures in Lillehammer
Churches in Innlandet
Churches in Sør-Gudbrandsdal Deanery
Long churches in Norway
Wooden churches in Norway
19th-century Church of Norway church buildings
Churches completed in 1875
1875 establishments in Norway